Pucciniastrum arcticum is a plant pathogen infecting caneberries.

References

 Fungal plant pathogens and diseases
 Small fruit diseases
 Pucciniales
 Fungi described in 1895